Anomaly: Warzone Earth is a real-time strategy tower defense video game by 11 bit studios. The game was initially announced in late 2010, and released on April 8, 2011 for Windows and Mac OS X.

Plot
The game is set in the near future, where sections of an alien spacecraft have crash-landed in several major cities around the world including Baghdad and Tokyo.

The player assumes the role of the commander of an armor battalion (referred to as "14th Platoon" in the story) sent to investigate anomalies that have occurred in the vicinity of the wreckage and gather information on what is happening in the affected areas, as the anomalies are interfering with radar and satellite imagery - and to neutralize any threats that may exist within the anomalies' field of influence.

Gameplay

The style of the gameplay has been described as "reverse tower defense", "tower attack", and "tower offense". Players control a convoy of vehicles investigating anomalies around sections of a downed alien spacecraft, which are protected by various types of defensive towers that have to be destroyed. Players do not directly control the vehicles in the convoy, rather they set paths for the convoy to follow along city streets, while also dropping power-ups such as decoys or smoke-screens to aid the survival of the convoy. In addition, players can purchase and equip a number of different units with varying offensive and defensive attributes to make up the convoy.

In the Windows, Mac, Linux and XBLA versions, players directly control a soldier on foot (dubbed the Commander) whom they use to pick up and drop the power-ups for the convoy. The iOS and Android versions omit the Commander in lieu of the player directly placing power using the touch-based interface. In addition, the iOS and Android versions do not feature the levels set in Tokyo.

Release
Anomaly: Warzone Earth was released on PC and Mac on April 8, 2011; and was released on iOS on August 11, 2011 as separate apps for iPhone and iPad. An Android version followed, initially as an exclusive release on the Amazon Appstore, on November 29, 2011, then as a general Android Market release on January 25, 2012. The game was released on Xbox Live Arcade in April 2012. A beta linux version was created but quickly scrapped as it was too buggy.

Reception

Anomaly: Warzone Earth received strong reviews from critics. GamesBeat gave the game a score of 80/100, saying, "While it's hard to control, Anomaly is still playable and enjoyable as long as you take the time to really master the interface first.". Select Start Media awarded the game 7.9/10, praising the unique idea of "tower offence" and solid gameplay. As of November 14, 2011, the iOS version is one of the highest rated iOS games of all time on Metacritic with a score of 94.

In June 2011, OS X version was awarded with Apple Design Award during Apple Worldwide Developers Conference. At the end of 2011 Apple has posted their annual iTunes and App Store rewind lists, where Anomaly: Warzone Earth has been entitled Game Of The Year Runner-Up.

iOS version was chosen Game Of The Year Runner-Up by TouchArcade, and was named the "Best Strategy" iOS game of the year in TouchGen Editor's Choice Awards. The PC version was also nominated by GameSpot for the Best Strategy Game of 2011 title.

Sequel
In August 2012, 11 bit studios announced that a sequel titled Anomaly: Korea will be released. The game, set several months after the events of Anomaly: Warzone Earth, featured new units and new powers. On February 28, 2013, 11 bit studios announced on their social networks that Anomaly 2 would be coming out soon. The game was debuted at Boston's PAX East on March 22, 2013.

References

External links
 

11 bit studios games
2011 video games
Android (operating system) games
BlackBerry games
Cancelled Linux games
IOS games
MacOS games
PlayStation Network games
Real-time strategy video games
Tower defense video games
Video games developed in Poland
Windows games
Xbox 360 Live Arcade games
Apple Design Awards recipients
Headup Games games